Abraham Simon (May 30, 1913 – October 24, 1969) was an American professional heavyweight boxer. He fought Joe Louis for the world heavyweight title twice.  He was managed for most of his career by Jimmy Johnston, and trained by Freddie Brown.    In 1940, he was rated the sixth best heavyweight in the world, and would rise higher in the next two years. After retiring, he became an actor and had roles in two of America's best known boxing movies, Academy Award winner On the Waterfront,  and Requiem for a Heavyweight.

Early life
Simon was born to  Jewish parents Max and Rose in Richmond Hill, Queens, New York on May 30, 1913, and attended John Adams High School.  He was a star lineman on his high school football team and was an interscholastic shot-put champion before taking up boxing.  During a High School football game, several boxing promoters in the crowd noticed his strength and told him if he pursued boxing, he could have a lucrative career and they could arrange for him to be trained by the legendary trainer and cut man Freddie Brown.  Brown trained many of boxing's greatest including Italian champions Rocky Marciano, and Graziano, and later Larry Holmes and Robert Duran. While pursuing his boxing career in his 20s he worked as a police patrolman in Long Beach, New York.

Professional boxing career

Early career 
Making a stir in his professional debut in March, 1935, at the age of 21, he knocked out Jim Dowling at the Jamaica Arena in Queens, New York.  According to most sources, in an impressive display, he won his next thirteen fights, and nearly all by knockout.  His two most notable early career losses against well known adversaries came against Lou Nova in 1936 in a six-round points decision and the six-foot-six Buddy Baer, brother of Max, who knocked him out in three rounds in 1937.

In a rare loss on January 22, 1940, he dropped a decision to Willie Reddish in a well-attended match in Philadelphia.  Simon was down twice in the match, and Reddish was given eight of the ten rounds.  Reddish peppered Simon's body and jaw with left hooks and right swings, and won an easy decision. In the prior month on December 6, 1939, Simon had defeated Reddish in a fourth-round TKO in Philadelphia. As was not uncommon in Simon's matches, he had a sizable weight advantage over his opponent, in this instance a remarkable fifty-six pounds.  The match took a turn for the worse in the fourth when the two boxers' heads clashed, and Reddish received a bad gash on his forehead, leading to the referee ending the fight from a technical knockout in the fourth.

Knockout of Jersey Joe Walcott
In one of his most memorable victories, in a ramp up to the heavyweight title, he knocked out the legendary Jersey Joe Walcott, a future heavyweight champion, in six rounds in Newark, New Jersey, on February 12, 1940.  A heavyweight in every sense, he benefitted from a remarkable sixty-two pound weight advantage in the match.  Behind in points in the first five rounds, Simon unleashed a tremendous right to the mouth of Walcott 2:32 into the sixth causing the knockout, and Walcott barely moved as he was counted out by the referee.

In a well-attended match against a known opponent, Simon defeated Eddie Blunt in a ten-round points decision at the Meadowbrook Bowl in Newark, New Jersey on May 20, 1940.  The last three rounds were fought in a heavy rain in the outdoor arena.  Simon outweighed Blunt by 28 pounds, and persevered to pull off the win with a points victory.

In one of his best known victories against a highly rated adversary, he defeated Roscoe Toles on December 6, 1940, in a ten-round unanimous decision before 5000 at Detroit's Olympia Stadium. After the fight, boxing promoter Mike Jacobs announced his intention to match Simon with Louis for the heavyweight championship. Simon performed better fighting in close, and was unaffected by a few punches to the jaw.  There were no knockdowns in the match.  Though Simon was the clear winner, the Detroit Free Press wrote that Toles more than held up his end of the fight looking far better in the fourth, and that only in the final rounds did Simon, showing greater endurance, take the fight to Toles.  He also had a heavily publicized win over Finland's Gunnar Barlund on October 7, 1940 in a ten-round points decision at New York's St. Nicholas Arena.  Barlund was soundly defeated suffering a cut eye and chin early in the match, and winning no more than two of the ten rounds.

World heavyweight contender
In his first attempt at the world heavyweight championship, on March 21, 1941, he lost to reigning heavyweight champion Joe Louis before a record crowd of 19,000 at Detroit's Olympia Stadium in a 13th-round technical knockout.   He was assisted in training for that match by the first African-American World Heavyweight Champion, Jack Johnson.   In the most valiant effort of his career against his greatest adversary, many ringside experts gave Simon the second, fourth, sixth, tenth, and eleventh rounds.  According to one source, when Louis knocked him down in the first round, it was the first knockdown of his professional career.  Simon even managed to stagger Louis briefly in the seventh.  Though he was down repeatedly in the thirteenth before the referee called the fight, his ability to withstand the blows of Louis and win four rounds placed him as a serious heavyweight contender in his mid-career.  After the fight, Louis told reporters, "for a big guy, he was pretty good and just about as tough as they come".

He lost to Louis again in his second and final attempt at the heavyweight title, at the coveted venue of Madison Square Garden on March 27, 1942, in a sixth-round technical knockout.  He was down at the bell in both the second and fifth rounds. Before 18,000 fans, Simon fought through a bruising attack by Louis, lumbering into the fourth round and connecting with a few blows, before succumbing to a brutal attack in the opening of the sixth.   Louis was fighting for the Army for the first time, and though he was fitter than in his first match with Simon, he was hoping for a quick knockout to avoid injury as he received no purse for the fight.  The match was a benefit for the Army Relief Fund, which helped both boxer's reputations and garnered a larger audience, including many servicemen.

Film and television
Between 1940 and 1962, Simon acted in small roles in several TV series and had parts in four movies.

Careers after boxing and death
Continuing his career in law enforcement after his second loss to Louis, he was appointed Deputy Police Commissioner of Long Beach in 1942.  From 1947 to 1956, he had a successful part-time career as a boxing referee in the New York area.  For most of his adult life he lived on 215th Street in Long Island's Bayside Hills, in Queens, New York.  He began working as a detective at Roosevelt Raceway in 1957, and after suffering from arthritis, switched to Public Relations around 1966.

He died on October 24, 1969 at Meadowbrook Hospital in East Meadow, Long Island, leaving a wife, Rita (Siebel), whom he had married in 1942, and two children, Alfred and Kathleen.  A week before his death, he had been working in his Public Relations job for the Roosevelt Raceway, when he suffered a serious heart attack.  He was buried at Mount Ararat Cemetery in East Farmingdale, Suffolk County, New York.

Selected bouts

|-
| align="center" colspan=8|6 Wins,5 Losses,1 Draw
|-
| align="center" style="border-style: none none solid solid; background: #e3e3e3"|Result
| align="center" style="border-style: none none solid solid; background: #e3e3e3"|Opponent
| align="center" style="border-style: none none solid solid; background: #e3e3e3"|Date
| align="center" style="border-style: none none solid solid; background: #e3e3e3"|Location
| align="center" style="border-style: none none solid solid; background: #e3e3e3"|Result/Duration
| align="center" style="border-style: none none solid solid; background: #e3e3e3"|Notes
|-
| Win
| Jim Dowling
| Mar 11, 1935
| Jamaica, Queens
| 2nd Rnd. KO
| Boxing debut  
|-
| Loss
| Lou Nova
| Oct 21, 1936
| New York, New York
| 6 Rnds Points
| Rare early loss  
|-
| Loss
| Buddy Baer
| Aug 30, 1937
| Yankee Stad., Bronx
| 3rd Rnd TKO
| Rare early loss  
|-
| Win
| Willie Reddish
| Dec 6, 1939
| Philadelphia
| 4 Rnd TKO
| Reddish had gash on his forehead 
|-
| Loss
| Willie Reddish
| Jan 22, 1940
| Philadelphia
| 10 Rnds Points
| Simon floored twice  
|-
| Win
| Jersey Joe Walcott
| Feb 12, 1940
| Laurel Garden, Newark, NJ
| 6th Rnd KO
| Walcott, future heavywt. champ  
|-
| Win
| Eddie Blunt
| May 20, 1940
| Newark, New Jersey
| 10 Rnd Points
| Fought in the rain  
|-
| Win
| Roscoe Toles
| Dec 6, 1940
| Detroit, MI
| 10 Rnds 
| Unanimous Dec.
|-
| Win
| Gunnar Barlund
| Oct. 7, 1940
| New York, New York
| 10 Rnd Points Dec.
| At St. Nicholas Arena 
|-
| Loss
| Joe Louis
| Mar 21, 1941
| Detroit, Michigan
| 13th Rnd TKO
| Heavyweight title match* 
|-
| style="background: #dae2f1"|*Draw*
| Turkey Thompson
| Oct 6, 1941
| Los Angeles, CA
| 10 Rnd Points
| Well-publicized match 
|-
| Loss
| Joe Louis
| Mar 27, 1942
| Mad. Sq. Garden, NY
| 6th Rnd TKO
| Heavyweight title match*19,000 fans
|-

References

External links
  

1913 births
1969 deaths
Heavyweight boxers
Male actors from New York City
People from Bayside, Queens
People from Richmond Hill, Queens
Boxers from New York City
20th-century American male actors
American male boxers
Jewish boxers
Jewish American boxers
20th-century American Jews